DWJS (621 AM) Radyo Pilipinas is a radio station owned and operated by the Philippine Broadcasting Service. The station's studio and transmitter are located at Lignon Hill, Legazpi, Albay.

References

Radio stations in Legazpi, Albay
News and talk radio stations in the Philippines
Radio stations established in 1997